Banker Margayya is 1983 Indian Kannada-language film directed by T. S. Nagabharana, based on the novel The Financial Expert by R. K. Narayan, and starring Lokesh in the lead role.

The film won the National Film Award for Best Feature Film in Kannada in 1984 and at the 1983–84 Karnataka State Film Awards, Lokesh was awarded the Best actor.

Plot
Bad culture drives out good culture. Bad money drives out good money. But here, quick money itself, acquired by a miser, though initially boosts his image in the society gradually makes him understand that human values are more important than money.

The film is derived from R. K. Narayan's novel The Financial Expert, another of his works set in Malgudi. Margayya is a smart money-lender who, by advising villagers about the rules of borrowing money, sends corrupt bank officials running scared. By a quirk of fate he loses this upper hand. He tries odd jobs to beat poverty but it takes another quirk of fate for his life to change. As with a lot of Narayan's works, the sum total of joy and despair might end up at zero, but the experience is always up in the positives.

An ironic morality tale about an entrepreneur whose endeavours are constantly ruined by his son. Margayya (Lokesh) starts out as a moneylender sitting under a banyan tree opposite a co-operative bank, filling in forms, and offering advice to the villagers of Narayan's fictional village of Malgudi, usually on how to circumvent the bank's bureaucratic process of offering loans. His career as a banker is ruined when his son Balu (master manjunath) throws away all the account books in gutter. Then Margayya publishes a sex manual with its author, a Dr. Pal (Urs). The venture is very profitable. But balu life was spoiled by reading this book, so he stops publishing these sex books. Then with the help of Dr. Pal he starts a bank of his own thus becomes banker Margayya. Margayya becomes wealthier than all the banks in the area. But Balu is the victim of the salacious book and starts visiting prostitute with  Dr. Pal. Once balu was caught by his father when he was in illegal activity along with Dr. Pal, angry Margayya thrashes Dr. Pal black and blue. The insulted Dr. Pal spoils all of Margayya's business and Margayya has to start all over again under his banyan tree, with the threatening but beloved presence of his grandson by his side.

Cast
Lokesh as Banker Margayya
 Jayanthi
 Sundar Raaj as balu
 Vijayaranjini
 Sundar Krishna Urs as Dr.Pal
 Musuri Krishnamurthy
 Master Manjunath as younger balu
 Pramila Joshai

Soundtrack

The music of the film was composed by Vijaya Bhaskar

Awards and honors
 This movie was selected for Indian Panorama.
 National Film Awards 1983 - Best Kannada Film
 Karnataka State Film Awards 1983-84 - Best Actor - Lokesh

References

External links

1980s Kannada-language films
1983 films
Films based on Indian novels
Adaptations of works by R. K. Narayan
Films scored by Vijaya Bhaskar
Best Kannada Feature Film National Film Award winners
Films directed by T. S. Nagabharana